Stefano Fortunato (born 15 January 1990) is an Italian footballer who plays as a goalkeeper.

Biography
Son of former footballer Daniele Fortunato, Fortunato started his career at Veneto club Montecchio Maggiore. Fortunato was selected by Veneto Regional Allievi Representative Team in 2006. He made his senior debut in 2006–07 Serie D season. In August 2008 he was signed by Serie A club Parma. He was the backup of Andrea Gasparri in the "spring" under-20 league. In 2009, he left for Italian third tier club Pro Patria. In 2010–11 Lega Pro Seconda Divisione, Fortunato was the fourth keeper behind Luca Anania, Matteo Andreoletti and Andrea Sala.

In July 2011 he was signed by Serie B club Modena. He was the understudy of Nicholas Caglioni and Matteo Guardalben. He made his club debut in 2011–12 Coppa Italia against top division club Chievo. Both team fielded with inferior squad and Modena losing to the Veneto side 0–3. Fortunato also played for Modena "spring" in round 2 to 4, round 10, 15 and 17 as overage player. He wore no.88 shirt in the first team. Fortunato made his Serie B debut as sub on 20 May 2012.

In August 2012 he started to train with Vicenza Calcio. On 19 August Fortunato appeared for Vicenza as unused bench in 2012–13 Coppa Italia.

On 31 August 2013 he was signed by the third-tier club Venezia in 1-year contract.

After 8 months without a club, on 25 February 2016, Fortunato was signed by Novara. Arezzo also announced the signing of Fortunato on 9 June 2015. However, the deal did not materialize.

On 1 September 2016 Fortunato joined South Tyrol, replacing Achille Coser.

In 2017 Fortunato returned to Vicenza Calcio on a two-year contract.

References

External links
 Lega Serie B Profile  
 AIC profile (data by football.it) 
 

1990 births
Living people
Footballers from Turin
Italian footballers
Parma Calcio 1913 players
Aurora Pro Patria 1919 players
Modena F.C. players
Association football goalkeepers